Made in Bangladesh is a political satire film by Mostofa Sarwar Farooki released in 2007. The movie's release was delayed by a year because of opposition from Bangladesh Film Censor Board over the contents of the film.

Plot
The main protagonist is a deranged individual based in Bangladesh.

Cast
Zahid Hasan as Khorshed Alam
Shahiduzzaman Selim as Nawshad
Tariq Anam Khan as DC
Srabosti Dutta Tinni
Dilara Zaman
Masud Ali Khan as SP
Hasan Masood as ACP Bakul
Marzuk Russell as Sadekur Rahman
Fazlur Rahman Babu as Nazrul
Tania Ahmed 
Minhajul Abedin as Shei Lok

References

2007 films
Bengali-language Bangladeshi films
Bangladeshi satirical films
Films directed by Mostofa Sarwar Farooki
Films shot in Chittagong Division
2000s Bengali-language films
Impress Telefilm films